Green field National Highway 352A, commonly referred to as NH 352A is a national highway in  India. It is a spur road of National Highway 352. NH-352A traverses the state of Haryana in India.

Route 
Jind - Gohana - Sonipat.

Junctions  

  Terminal near Jind.
  near Gohana.
  Terminal near Sonipat.

See also 

 List of National Highways in India
 List of National Highways in India by state

References

External links 

 NH 352A on OpenStreetMap

Proposed roads in India
National Highways in Haryana
Expressways in Haryana
Transport in Jind
Transport in Sonipat